The viceregal consort of Canada is the spouse of the serving governor general of Canada, assisting the viceroy with ceremonial and charitable work, accompanying him or her to official state occasions, and occasionally undertaking philanthropic work of their own. As the host/hostess of the royal and viceroyal residence in Ottawa, the consort, if female, is also known as the chatelaine of Rideau Hall. This individual, who ranks third in the Canadian order of precedence, after the Canadian monarch and the governor general, is addressed as His or Her Excellency while their spouse is in office, and is made ex officio an Extraordinary Companion of the Order of Canada and a Knight or Dame of Justice of the Most Venerable Order of the Hospital of Saint John of Jerusalem.

The present viceregal consort is Whit Fraser, the husband of Governor General Mary Simon, who took office on July 26, 2021.

Role

The position of the viceregal consort carries no official duties and receives no salary. However, consorts have held and do hold a prominent and visible position in the Canadian affairs of state, taking part in official occasions, such as the speech from the throne and Order of Canada investitures, and national celebrations, such as Canada Day events on Parliament Hill, as well as both welcoming foreign dignitaries to Canada and accompanying the governor general on state visits abroad. These practices evolved from the original role as the hostess of the royal and viceroyal residences in Ottawa (Rideau Hall) and Quebec City (La Citadelle), a tradition maintained only by female viceregal consorts, who oversee the planning of ceremonies and functions of state that take place at either of the official residences.

Over the course of the 20th century, it became increasingly common for viceregal consorts to select and pursue on their own initiative various charitable projects. Princess Alice, Countess of Athlone, whose husband served as governor general during the Second World War, volunteered her time to the war effort in Canada, especially women's organisations such as the Royal Canadian Air Force Women's Division. The activities chosen are typically apolitical and non-divisive. However, some consorts have stirred controversy through their work; Jean-Daniel Lafond, who promoted Canadian art—film in particular—and involved himself in the Francophone community, made a documentary while viceregal consort that attracted criticism from the National Post that Lafond had shown strong anti-Americanism and had been sympathetic to an admitted assassin.

Only once has the title of Chatelaine of Rideau Hall been held by someone who was not the spouse of the governor general—as Vincent Massey was a widower, his daughter-in-law, Lilias Massey, held the title and performed the official duties of the chatelaine. Unlike a viceregal consort, however, Lilias Massey was not addressed as Her Excellency.

List of viceregal consorts

Viceregal consorts of New France, 1627–1760

Viceregal consorts of British North America, 1760–1867

Viceregal consorts of Canada, 1867–present

Canadian institutions established by viceregal consorts
 Lady Stanley Institute for Trained Nurses – The Countess of Derby
 Ottawa Maternity Hospital – The Marchioness of Aberdeen
 Victorian Order of Nurses – The Marchioness of Aberdeen
 Lady Minto Hospital – The Countess of Minto

See also
 List of royal consorts of Canada
 King consort
 Queen consort

Notes

References

External links

 

Lists of Canadian people
Canada